Leimarel Sidabi or Leimalel Sitapi is a goddess in Meitei mythology and the religion of Ancient Kangleipak (Antique Manipur). She is the highest female divinity in the Meitei pantheon. She is the goddess of earth, of nature and the household. She is revered as the mother of every living being in the universe.

Presently, the market complex number 1 is named after her at the Ima Keithel (Mothers' market), the world's only market run exclusively by women.

Etymology 
The Meitei word "Leimarel" (ꯂꯩꯃꯔꯦꯜ) or "Leimaren" (ꯂꯩꯃꯔꯦꯟ) means "queen" or "goddess" in English. The word "Leimarel" (or "Leimaren") can be broken into the syllables "Lei" (ꯂꯩ), "Ma" (ꯃ) and "-ren" (-ꯔꯦꯟ) or "-rel" (-ꯔꯦꯜ). "Lei" means land or earth. "Ma" means mother. "-ren" (or "-rel") means excellent. The Meitei word "Sidabi" can be broken into "Si" (ꯁꯤ), "-da" (ꯗ) and "-bi" (-ꯕꯤ). "Si" ("See") means "to die". "-da" denotes negative meaning. "-bi" ("-bee") denotes feminine gender.

Description 
Leimarel is the eternal mother goddess. In ancient times, the ruling royal couples sat in the Laplen Ka (the central room). They faced the sacred spot of goddess Leimarel. It was believed that men and women originated from Leimarel's womb. A house symbolises the Mother in traditional Meitei cosmic beliefs.

Mythology 
The supreme creator Atingkok (alias Salailel) asked his two sons, Sanamahi and Pakhangba to run in a race around the world. The winner would become the ruler of the world. Sanamahi was stronger than his younger brother, Pakhangba. He started his journey. Pakhangba wept to his mother, Leimarel Sidabi. She told him the secret behind the throne of the universe. The secret is that going around the throne of the Supreme Being is equivalent to going around the universe. So, Pakhangba went around the Supreme Being, his father. Thus, he won the race and became the ruler of the universe. When Sanamahi returned home, he found his younger brother sitting on the throne. He got angry. He attacked Pakhangba. Pakhangba ran away. He hid himself among seven lairembis (celestial divine maidens). The Supreme Being intervened the situation. He brought peace of Sanamahi. He made Sanamahi as the king of the household of the mankind. At the same time, goddess Leimarel Sidabi became another Imung Lai (household deity), besides Sanamahi.

According to some legends, goddess Ima Leimaren (lit. Mother Leimarel) takes care of the market. She brings peace and harmony by doing so. This tradition is still maintained by womenfolk. The women are considered as the descendents of the "Ima".

During the infant world, the creator God Atingkok Maru Sidaba asked goddess Leimarel Sidabi to produce another goddess from herself. After the production, the new goddess was named as Emoinu (Imoinu), who was sent to earth as the guardian goddess of humankind.

Texts 
Several ancient texts (PuYas) write things about the goddess Leimarel. Some include the Leimaren Naoyom, the Leimaren Langon, the Leimaren Mingkhei, the Leimaren Shekning Lasat, the Leimaren Ungoiron, besides other texts.

Worship 
Leimarel Sidabi and her son Sanamahi are worshipped in the first room of every Meitei household. Goddess Leimarel doesn't want the Korou Anganba in the morning. So, houses of Loi castes are mainly made facing southwards. She lives in water also. So, she is worshipped in an Isaiphu (an earthen pitcher or terracotta pot containing water). There are no images kept to represent the two deities inside their abode.

A senior woman of a house fills the earthen pot of the goddess with fresh water. She does this after taking a holy bath. Fresh flowers, fruits, vegetables and rice are offered. Prayers are also offered to protect the family members from every troubles.

The maibas perform rites and rituals by chanting hymns dedicated to goddess Leimaren (ancestral mother goddess). It is generally done inside the house. Water, rice and flowers are mainly placed.

Shayon (incarnations) 
Leimarel Sidabi is known for her various incarnation in different forms possessing diverse attributes.

The following are her incarnations:

Festivals 

Goddess Leimarel Sidabi and her son Sanamahi are mainly worshipped in many religious occasions. Some are Sajibu Cheiraoba and Saroi-Khangba. Cheiraoba is the Meitei new year (Manipuri new year) festival. Saroi-Khangba is a religious event to please the evil spirits.

 In the festival of Mera Chaorel Houba, God Lainingthou Sanamahi and goddess Leimarel Sidabi are worshipped in the famous Sanamahi Temple by offering fruits and vegetables.
 In the Meitei festival of Sajibu Cheiraoba, goddess Leimarel Sidabi is worshipped by offering her the uncooked rice by the devotees.

Pantheon 
Goddess Leimarel Sidabi, besides being worshipped in Manipur, Assam and Tripura, has her pantheon in Bangladesh and Myanmar too.
In Myanmar, one of the famous shrines of Ema Leimarel Sidabi is located at the Ye Ki Bauk village, where the Meitei people worship her.

In Arts 

Among the nine forms of musical rhythms (Seisaks) of Pena (musical instrument), the Leimarel Sheisak is one. This singing style (tune) of Meitei tradition (Manipuri culture) is sung during the festival of Lai Haraoba.

In the novel The Tales of Kanglei Throne, goddess Leimarel Sidabi is presented as Nongda Nongkhal Lembi.

Namesakes

In commerce 
Ima Keithel is the world's only women run market. It has 3 major complexes. Leimarel Sidabi Ima Keithel is the Complex Number 1 of the market. It is followed by Imoinu Ima Keithel (Complex Number 2) and Phouoibi Ima Keithel (Complex Number 3). This 500 year old market is in the center of Imphal, Manipur.

In geography 
The Leimarel Hill is a hill in Manipur. Trekkers go here for panaromic viewing of 360 degree of Loktak Lake.

References

Bibliography 
 Ariba Meiteigee Seitha by Gourachandra, Mayanglambam
 Kangleikhol January 1988 by Kangjia, Ng
 Leimarel Mingkhei by Bhogeshawr, Oinam
 Yimpallon by Singh, Wakhemcha Tomba

External links 

 Internet Archive, Leimarel
 E-pao, Leimarel
Journal on Sanamahism religion (read 5th paragraph ) 
 celebrates-mera-chaoren-houba/ Celebrating Sanamahism festival
 NATURE WORSHIP

Creator goddesses
Earth goddesses
Leima
Meitei deities
Mother goddesses
Names of God in Sanamahism
Nature goddesses
Sanamahism